"Tar Pit" is the first episode of the second season of the 1975 American television series Land of the Lost. Written by Margaret Armen and directed by Gordon Wiles, it first aired in the United States on September 6, 1975 on NBC.

Plot
Cha-Ka is painting a picture of Ta with the help of Sa on a rock by the tar pit. Meanwhile, while playing with Dopey, Spot falls into the pit. Dopey tries to join him and falls on a broken rock in the pit. The two dinosaurs pine for help and Cha-Ka discovers them, forgoing his painting to Ta's chagrin.

Cha-Ka runs for help while Spot escapes, leaving Dopey. Will, Holly, and Rick fashion a lasso to save the dinosaur. Dopey proves too heavy, however, and the lariat breaks. Will and Rick begin building a pulley system to make use of mechanical advantage, and Cha-Ka goes to recruit Ta and Sa in the operation.

Sa has taken over the painting of Sa, but is only making it worse. When Cha-Ka arrives, he convinces Ta (and Sa) to help on the condition that afterward he will complete the portrait. Will and Rick complete their pulley, but it falls apart on the first try. Ta and Sa leave, taking Cha-Ka with them. The Marshalls give up on Dopey but nonetheless camp out beside the dinosaur.

That evening Cha-Ka leads Emily to the tar pit, and Rick ties Dopey's rope around Emily's neck. When Emily refuses to leave, Will and Rick use torches to scare her away, causing her to pull Dopey out of the pit.

Reception
In 2013 Wesley Eure, the actor who played Will, recalled this episode's unusually extensive use of the artificial language Pakuni in the following way:

References

External links
 

Land of the Lost (1974 TV series) episodes
1975 American television episodes